Harindranath Chattopadhyay (2 April 1898 – 23 June 1990) was an Indian English poet, dramatist, actor, musician and a member of the 1st Lok Sabha from Vijayawada constituency. He was the younger brother of Sarojini Naidu, the second woman President of the Indian National Congress and first Indian woman to hold the position, and Virendranath Chattopadhyay, an international communist revolutionary. The Government of India awarded him the civilian honour of the Padma Bhushan in 1973.

Life
Harindranath a poet and singer, he is famous for poems such as Noon and Shaper Shaped. His father was a Doctorate of Science from the University of Edinburgh, settled in Hyderabad State, where he founded and administered the Hyderabad College, which later became the Nizam's College in Hyderabad. His mother was a poet and used to write poetry in Bengali. His other interests were politics, music, theatre and cinema.

His first book of poems, The Feast of Youth, was published when he was 19 years old, and received praise from Arthur Quiller-Couch and James Henry Cousins. He wrote in English but of topics relating to ancient Indian culture and Vedic ideas.

He was awarded Padma Bhushan in 1973. He married Kamaladevi Chattopadhyaya, a Socialist and leader of Women, who created the All India Women's Conference, the Indian Cooperative Union and also was the inspiration for the All Indian Handicraft's Board, a body which revived many Indian handicrafts (such as pottery and weaving), decimated by the Industrial Revolution in Britain in the 19th century. A son died in 2008 but another survives. Kamaladevi and Harin's divorce was the first legal separation granted by the courts of India. It was amicable.

Harindranath Chattopadhyaya often recited his poem Rail Gaadi on All India Radio (Akashavani). The song was memorably sung by Ashok Kumar in the film Aashirwad. He himself wrote the lyrics, composed the music and sang a few songs, notable among which were Surya Ast Ho Gaya and Tarun Arun Se Ranjit Dharani. He also penned a number of poems for children in Hindi. His poems were appreciated by the Nobel Laureate Rabindranath Tagore.

In 1951 Lok Sabha elections Harindranath Chattopadhyaya won from Vijayawada Lok Sabha constituency in Madras State as an independent candidate, supported by the Communist Party of India. He was the member of the 1st Lok Sabha from 14 April 1952 to 4 April 1957.

His most famous acting role was in the Hindi movie Bawarchi (The Chef), which was made in 1972; it was adapted by Hrishikesh Mukherjee from the Bengali film Galpo Holeo Satti, directed by Tapan Sinha. Chattopadhyaya played the role of the strict and regimented patriarch of the house, where his sons, daughters-in-law and grandchildren lived in a joint family and still respected and abided by his rules. He had cameos in three Satyajit Ray films: playing the wizard Barfi in Goopi Gyne Bagha Byne, the human encyclopaedia, Sidhujyatha, in Sonar Kella, and the senior member of the Board of Directors, Sir Baren Roy, in Seemabaddha

The Earthen Goblet is a fine poem by Harendranath Chattopadhyay. The poem is written in a conversational tone. The poet presents a dialogue between the Goblet and the poet speaker. The poet asks the red goblet to recount its experiences as it is mounded by the Potter. When the potter made this goblet he used all his skills and he made the beautiful goblet which was full of impulse. The Potter worked hard with the clay and the clay enjoyed the fragrant companionship of the little flower and the unshapely earth which the Potter has taken away.

Fire is a tragic poem by Harendranath Chattopadhyay. In this poem the newly born baby asked query about the leaping flames. Actually the infant's dead mother was set on the fire and the child asked question to the flames. The fire already  consumed the dead mother and unveiled life in its lonely nakedness.  The answer came from the Fire that it is the terrible  desire  that shaped  the infant in his mother's womb.

Beside the Death Bed is a philosophical poem by this great poet. In this poem the poet says that the Death ithe highest bidder and the life is the lowest one. Then why there is strife in life.  According to the poet the man is the coffin  of  life  and the life is the cradle of death. Sorrow is a short poem by this intellectual  poet. The small poetic piece brings to the importance of sorrow which is created  by  creator. The poet says a person who  lost his lover realizes deep  and  intense sorrow. The poet uses an image of dove which is a symbol of Holy Spirit. Futurity  is a very different poem. Here the poet presents the man in the unique form. According to the poet time is the eternity's womb. Each man is like a foetus. All birth is yet to be born since  man is unfinished and still in the  making and the foetus is awaiting the time to be born. Shaper shaped  is one of the most beautiful  poem by Harendranath  Chattopadhyay. It is marked by  its stark simplicity. The poet shows how the shaper has been shaped into the objects which  he used to shape earlier. A potter shapes the clay &he makes a beautiful  pot. The poet praises his work of art. At the end of the poem  the poet kneels at the feet of the Supreme Power who is the creator of the potter.

He also acted in the 1984 Mumbai Doordarshan TV Serial Ados Pados, Amol Palekar was the protagonist in this serial.

Chattopadhyay died of cardiac arrest on 23 June 1990 in Bombay.

Works

Poems
 The Feast of Youth (1918)
 The Magic Tree (1922)
 Ancient Wings (1923)
 Blood of Stones (1944)
 Spring in Winter(1955)
 Virgin and Vineyards (1967)
 The Lady's Giant hat the Earthen globlet salute to R-day Tati Tati Tota (in Hindi)
 Voyage Things I Love (in English)
 “ Curious Town “ (In English)

Songs
 Surya Ast Ho Gaya Tarun Arun Se Ranjit Dharani    My heart is beating from Hindi movie Julie

Plays
 Abu Hassan (1918)
 Five Plays (1937)
 Siddhartha, Man of Peace'' (1956)

Filmography

Notes

External links
 

Bengali male poets
Bengali Hindus
English-language poets from India
1898 births
1990 deaths
Recipients of the Padma Bhushan in literature & education
Male actors in Hindi cinema
Bengali male actors
Male actors in Bengali cinema
Indian male dramatists and playwrights
India MPs 1952–1957
Indian male film actors
University of Calcutta alumni
People from British India
20th-century Indian male actors
Lok Sabha members from Andhra Pradesh
Male actors from Hyderabad, India
20th-century Indian poets
20th-century Indian dramatists and playwrights
Indian actor-politicians
Poets from Andhra Pradesh
Dramatists and playwrights from Andhra Pradesh
20th-century Indian male writers